The 1899–1900 season was Newton Heath's eighth season in the Football League and their sixth in the Second Division. They finished fourth in the league, which was not enough to earn promotion back to the First Division. In the FA Cup, the Heathens were knocked out in the First Round Qualifying by South Shore.

The club also entered teams in the Lancashire and Manchester Senior Cups in 1899–1900, but little progress was made in either competition. The club received a bye to the third round of the Manchester Senior Cup, but lost 5–0 to Bury. It was a similar story in the Lancashire Cup, as they beat Bolton Wanderers 3–2 in the first round before losing 1–0 to Southport Central in the second round.

Second Division

FA Cup

Manchester United F.C. seasons
Newton Heath